Don't Look Back Into the Darkness is the fourth full-length recording by Swedish band The Grand Opening. Originally released on Hamburg label Tapete Records.

Track listing
"Blacker Than Blue"
"False Light"
"Towards Your Final Rest"
"Free"
"There Is Always Hope"
"Old News"
"Target"
"The Living"
"Over the Fences"
"Tired Eyes"

Personnel
John Roger Olsson: vocals, electric guitar, acoustic guitar, keyboards, upright piano, vibraphone, xylophone, organ, percussion
Jens Pettersson: drums
Otto Johansson: baritone guitar
Patric Thorman: electric bass, double bass
Leo Svensson Sander: cello, organ, saw, synthesizer
Anna Ödlund: backing vocals
Johan Krantz: backing vocals
Johan Norin: trumpet

References

2013 albums
The Grand Opening albums
Tapete Records albums